Bogue Ealiah is a stream in the U.S. state of Mississippi. It is a tributary to Tallahala Creek.

Bogue Ealiah is a name derived from the Choctaw language meaning "long creek".

References

Rivers of Mississippi
Rivers of Jasper County, Mississippi
Mississippi placenames of Native American origin